The Kingdom of Cusco (sometimes spelled Cuzco and in Quechua Qosqo or Qusqu) was a small kingdom based in the city of Cusco, on the Andean mountain ranges that began as a small city-state founded by the Incas around the start of 13th century. In time, through warfare or peaceful assimilation, it began to grow and was succeeded by the Inca Empire (1438–1533).

History

Brief overview 
The Inca people began as a tribe in the Cuzco area around the start of 13th century. Under the leadership of Manco Cápac, they formed the small city-state of Cusco (Quechua Qosqo), shown in red on the map below.

In 1438 AD, under the command of the Sapa Inca (paramount leader) Pachacuti (world-shaker), the Incas began a far-reaching expansion.  The land which Pachacuti conquered was about the size of the Thirteen Colonies at the outbreak of the American Revolution of 1776, and consisted of nearly the entire territory of the Andes mountain range.

Pachacuti reorganized the kingdom of Cusco into an empire, the Tahuantinsuyu, a federalist system that consisted of a central government with the Inca at its head and four provincial governments with strong leaders: Chinchasuyu (NW), Antisuyu (NE), Kuntisuyu (SW), and Qullasuyu (SE). Pachacuti is thought to have built the citadel of Machu Picchu, either as a family home or as a vacation estate.

Sapa Incas
The Sapa Inca of the first dynasty of the Kingdom of Cusco were, in order, Manco Cápac, Sinchi Roca, Lloque Yupanqui, Mayta Cápac, and Cápac Yupanqui. Evidence of state organization dates from 1200 AD. Little is known of this population, but in later years the meaning of cápac meant warlord and sinchi meant leader adding to the idea they could have been rulers.

Long before the Spanish found the Inca, the Inca civilization had begun as a small, centralized state that eventually grew to cover a large amount of territory along the western coast of South America from Colombia to Chile. The Inca civilization spread rapidly from their small beginnings in the Kingdom of Cuzco located in southern Peru.

Beginning of the empire 

The following outlines each of the Incan rulers and a few of their accomplishments in greater detail.

Mayta Cápac: c. 1290s 

Mayta Cápac (Quechua: Mayta Qhapaq Inka) was the fourth Sapa Inca of the Kingdom of Cuzco (beginning around 1290 AD) and a member of the Hurin dynasty. The chroniclers describe him as a great warrior who conquered territories as far as Lake Titicaca, Arequipa, and Potosí. While in fact, his kingdom was still limited to the valley of Cuzco.

Fall of the civilization

Túpac Amaru: 1571–1572

Túpac Amaru was the last legitimate Inca to rule (in the Vilcabamba region as the Neo-Inca State). With the death of his elder brother Titu Cosi, he ordered the execution of all Spanish people living in Vilcabamba, and led an unsuccessful and poorly planned rebellion against the colonists. This resulted in his death and the end of Incan sovereignty, for Vilcabamba was occupied and the survivors enslaved in 1572.

References

Bibliography

  María Rostworowski. Enciclopedia Temática del Perú: Incas. Lima: El Comercio S.A., 2004.
  Editorial Sol 90. Historia Universal 5: América precolombina. Barcelona, España, 2002.
  Bushnell. Peru, Ancient people and places.
  MacQuarrie, Kim. The Last Days of the Incas. Simon & Schuster, 2007. .

External links
 “The Political Force of Images,” Vistas: Visual Culture in Spanish America, 1520–1820

15th-century disestablishments in the Inca civilization
States and territories established in 1197
States and territories established in 1438
Inca states
Former kingdoms
12th-century establishments in the Inca civilization
Former countries
Former monarchies of South America
Former countries in South America